Iliac circumflex or Circumflex iliac can refer to:
 Superficial circumflex iliac artery
 Superficial iliac circumflex vein
 Deep circumflex iliac artery
 Deep circumflex iliac vein